"Out of Control" is a song by English big beat duo the Chemical Brothers, released as the third single from their third album, Surrender (1999). The song's vocals and guitar are performed by Bernard Sumner from New Order, and additional vocals are provided by Bobby Gillespie of Primal Scream.

Following its release on 11 October 1999, "Out of Control" peaked at number 21 on the UK Singles Chart and claimed the number-one spot on the UK Dance Chart. It also reached the top 50 in New Zealand and Spain, as well as on the US Billboard Dance Club Songs chart.

Music video
The music video of the song was directed by W.I.Z. The video's cast includes actress Rosario Dawson and Michel Brown, and depicts a Mexican conflict between government and Zapatista Army of National Liberation, a revolutionary group that appeared during the 1990s. Then is revealed to be an advertisement for a fictional Coca-Cola-type beverage. The camera pans out to reveal it being displayed in an electronic shop, before the storefront is smashed in and the video ends with shaky night-time footage of violent urban riots, shot on handheld cameras.

Track listings

Credits and personnel
Credits are lifted from the Surrender album booklet.

Studios
 Recorded at Orinoco Studios (South London, England)
 Edited at Berwick Street Studios (London, England)
 Mastered at The Exchange (London, England)

Personnel

 The Chemical Brothers – production
 Tom Rowlands – writing
 Ed Simons – writing
 Bernard Sumner – writing, vocals, guitar
 Bobby Gillespie – additional vocals
 Steve Dub – engineering
 Cheeky Paul – editing
 Mike Marsh – mastering

Charts

Release history

References

1999 singles
1999 songs
Astralwerks singles
The Chemical Brothers songs
Songs written by Bernard Sumner
Songs written by Ed Simons
Songs written by Tom Rowlands
Virgin Records singles